Mika-Matti Maisonvaara (born 11 March 1991) is a Finnish football player currently playing for HIFK Fotboll. Playing mainly as a left midfielder, Maisonvaara can also play as full-back. He is technical player and can be utilized as a dead-ball specialist. He scored his first league goal from penalty spot against JJK on 1 July 2009.

References
 Guardian Football

1991 births
Living people
Finnish footballers
Veikkausliiga players
Rovaniemen Palloseura players
FC Santa Claus players
Association football defenders
Association football midfielders